Ridgedale Local School District is a public school district serving students in and around the village of Morral in Marion County, Ohio, United States. The superintendent is Dr. Erika Bower. As of October 2019, the school district enrolls 623 students and has an average class size of 48. In addition to Morral, the school district includes the communities of Big Island, Brush Ridge, Kirkpatrick, Meeker, and northwestern Marion.

Schools

Elementary schools
Ridgedale Elementary School (Grades K through 5th)

Middle and High Schools
Ridgedale High School (Grades 6th through 12th)

References

External links
District Website

School districts in Ohio
Education in Marion County, Ohio